Ny Tid (English: Modern Times Review) is Norway's largest international quarterly review of non-fiction books – up to 50 in each issue. It is currently owned by Ny Tid & Orientering AS.

Ny Tid is headed by the newspaper founder Truls Lie who was formerly the editor-in-chief of Morgenbladet and editor-in-chief/publisher of Le Monde diplomatique in Norway

History

Political Past
Ny Tid'''s predecessor was the weekly Orientering, which was founded as an independent weekly in January 1953.

The magazine gained notability thanks to the quality, reputation, and success of its writers including Sigurd Evensmo (the first editor-in-chief), Jens Bjørneboe, and Johan Borgen. Evensmo was a member of the Student's Communist Organisation and had been active in the resistance against the Nazis in Norway; Bjørneboe was a self-described anarcho-nihilist who was at the center of literary life in Norway; and Borgen was an author sent to prison by the Nazis for his writings.

In 1975 Orientering was included in the new Ny Tid. From 1975 until 1998 Ny Tid was owned by the Socialist Left Party (SV).

On 24 January 2006 the publishing house Damm, a part of Egmont, bought 100 percent of Ny Tid. On 27 January 2006 Ny Tid was relaunched as Norway's first news magazine. In January 2008 the magazine was transferred to a new media group, Monitor Medier, which at the same time also purchased the monthly Le Monde Diplomatique.

Voices Without Borders
Every week an exclusive column is printed, in which writers from free speech-challenged countries are invited to comment and outline. These columnists are: Parvin Ardalan, Nawal El Saadawi, Irshad Manji, Elena Milashina, Katiuska Natera, Martha Roque, Blessing Musariri, Tsering Woeser, Orzala Ashraf Nemat and Natalia Novozhilova. The columns are mostly written in English. The project is called "Voices Without Borders" and is a project in memory of Anna Politkovskaja, who was a Ny Tid columnist from 10 February to 7 October 2006.

Content and Style
Since the relaunch in January 2006, the independent magazine, regularly prints exclusive columns by writers like Noreena Hertz (Great Britain), Irshad Manji (Canada), Anna Funder (Australia), Shah Muhammad Rais (Afghanistan), Saskia Sassen (USA), Natalia Novozhilova, and Anna Politkovskaya (Russia), the independent journalist assassinated after a series of articles she published about corruption and the KGB under the Putin presidency.

The magazine has a global outlook with most of its articles focusing on current events across the globe. It is published in Norwegian for its print edition and in both English and Norwegian for its online edition. It covers politics, culture, environmental issues, and international affairs. The current editor is Dag Herbjørnsrud. The editorial staff is based in Oslo, while the correspondents are situated in five continents.

In 2015 Ny Tid was changed to a monthly broadsheet newspaper summer 2015, and also included in the distribution of the daily newspaper Klassekampen making it available to more readers. The main focus is peace&war, migration, climate, new media, and international documentary films and non-fiction books.

 Editors 
Truls Lie 2015–present
Dag Herbjørnsrud 2008–2015
Martine Aurdal 2006–2008
Dag Herbjørnsrud 2005–2006
Anders Horn 2001–2005
Anne Hege Simonsen 1998–2001
Runar I. Malkenes 1995–1998
Turid Grønlund 1994–1995
Gunnar Ringheim 1991–1994
Bernt Eggen 1989–1991
Finn Gustavsen 1986–1989
Ingolf Håkon Teigene 1982–1986
Steinar Hansson 1979–1982
Audgunn Oltedal 1975–1979

CirculationAs a newspaper: 1979: 16267
 1980: 15117
 1981: 15662
 1982: 15474
 1983: 14722
 1984: 14945
 1985: 13482
 1986: 12659
 1987: 10877
 1988: 9803
 1989: 9071
 1990: 8021
 1991: 8212
 1992: 8155
 1993: -
 1994: 6950
 1995: 5704
 1996: 5593
 1997: 4722
 1998: 4772
 1999: 4095
 2000: 3939
 2001: 4599
 2002: 4834
 2003: 4519
 2004: 4199
 2005: 4320As a magazine:''

 2006: 9258
 2007: 7671
 2008: 4811
 2009: 4774
 2015: 35 000 (included in Klassekampen

Notes

External links
 Official site
 International site

1975 establishments in Norway
Magazines established in 1975
Magazines published in Oslo
Monthly magazines published in Norway
News magazines published in Europe
Norwegian-language magazines
Weekly magazines published in Norway